The Weimar Princely Free Drawing School was an art and literature educational establishment. It was set up in 1776 in Weimar by the scholar and ducal private-secretary Friedrich Justin Bertuch (1747–1822) and the painter Georg Melchior Kraus (1737–1806), as part of Weimar Classicism. It was financed by the young Charles Augustus, Grand Duke of Saxe-Weimar-Eisenach and heavily promoted by Goethe, who also taught there. Among its pupils were Charles Augustus's future mistress Karoline Jagemann. It lasted until 1930.

From 1824/25, under the oversight of custodian and painter Louise Seidler (1786–1866), it also housed the grand-ducal art collection.

Aims
The foundation of the school is a clear indication of the rising interest in arts and crafts in court circles in the second half of 18th century. Its immediate main aim was to instruct local craftsmen in drawing, to sharpen their sense of aesthetics in consumables and in the longer term to increase the quality of production in handcrafts. In order to disseminate art, taste and a sense of beauty to as wide a public as possible, the lessons and living quarters were open to all classes and both sexes. It was an important place for the discovery and promotion of new talent and drew many artists into the orbit of Weimar Classicism and its "".

From 1837 the dissolved grand-ducal art collection was also put at the school's disposal.

The school's first annual exhibition, for the pupils to display their work publicly, was in 1779. The prize related to the exhibition was traditionally awarded on 3 September, the birthday of Charles Augustus.

Related people

Directors
 1776–1806: Georg Melchior Kraus (1737–1806), painter and etcher, see above
 1807–1832: Johann Heinrich Meyer (1760–1832), painter and artwriter, friend of Goethe, Lecturer from 1795 
 1833–1842: Ludwig von Schorn (1793-1842), Art Lecturer, Custodian of the Grand-Ducal Art Collection
 1842–1861: Gustav Adolf Schöll (1805–1882), archaeologist, librarian and historian of literature
 1861–1868: Johann Christian Schuchardt (1799–1870), copper engraver, former private secretary of Goethe.
 1868–1873: Friedrich Preller the Elder (1804–1878), former pupil, painter and etcher, lecturer from 1843
 1873: Sixtus Armin Thon (1817–1901), former pupil, painter, etcher and lithographer, 1873 interim director
 1896-1917: Hugo Flintzer (1862–1917), painter (Max Thedy's pupil)
 1917-1926: Franz Goepfart (1866-1926), painter (Max Thedy's pupil)
 1926-1930: Arno Metzeroth (1874-1937), painter

Teachers
Besides the directors, these figures also taught at the school:
 1776: Martin Gottlieb Klauer (1742-1801), sculptor
 1795: Konrad Horny (1764-1807), engraver
 until 1820: Ferdinand Jagemann (1780–1820), painter

Pupils
Sorted by class, its pupils included:
 Caroline Jagemann (1735–1804), singer and actor
 Johann Wolfgang von Goethe (1749–1832) and his grandson Wolfgang
 Charlotte von Stein (1742–1827), courtier, friend of Goethe
 Corona Schröter (1751–1802), singer and actor, central figure in Goethe's 
 Julie von Egloffstein (1792–1869), courtier, later a painter
 Franz Horny (1798–1824), later a painter
 Friedrich Preller the Elder (1804–1878), later painter, teacher and director of the school (see above)
  (1805–1859), later a flower painter
 Angelica Facius (1806–1887), later a flower painter and medal-designer
 Ferdinand Bellermann (1814–1889), later a landscape painter
 Friedrich Martersteig (1814–1899), later a painter
 Sixtus Armin Thon (1817–1901), later painter and interim director of the school (see above)
 Carl Hummel (1821–1907), later a painter
 Karl Hagemeister (1848–1933), later a painter
  (1888-1965), later  of the 
 Marianne Brandt (1893–1983), later painter, sculptor and designer

Notes

Bibliography

External links
  

1776 establishments in the Holy Roman Empire
1930 disestablishments in Germany
Art schools in Germany
Education in Weimar
Culture in Weimar
History of Weimar